West Liberty is an unincorporated community and Census-designated Place in Fox Township, Jasper County, Illinois, United States.

References

Unincorporated communities in Illinois
Unincorporated communities in Jasper County, Illinois